Akkuş is a village in the central district of Hakkâri Province in Turkey. The village is populated by Kurds of the Mamxûran tribe and had a population of 86 in 2022.

The hamlet of Çetintaş is attached to the village.

Population 
Population history from 2000 to 2022:

References 

Kurdish settlements in Hakkâri Province
Villages in Hakkâri District